Hercules and the Princess of Troy is a 1965 Italian-American made-for-television adventure fantasy film directed by Albert Band. It was originally made as a pilot for a television series which never materialized. Albeit very short, the film was released to US television as a feature film. It is also referred to as Hercules vs the Sea Monster in reference books.

Plot
The film opens with the statement that the people of Troy must once a month sacrifice a maiden lest a sea monster destroy their city. Because of this, some families flee Troy only to be captured by pirates.  Hercules (Gordon Scott), aboard the Olympia, comes across one of these ships and frees the Trojans aboard.  Going to Troy, Hercules is given use of two horses that cannot be wounded by arrows.  He then learns from Ortag (Roger Browne) the monster's weakness: its armor doesn't cover its belly.

Shortly afterwards, a boxer tries to poison Hercules but is impaled on his own spiked gloves and dies.  Then Hercules and Ulysses (Mart Hulswit) are attacked by what appear to be thieves, and Diogenes (Paul Stevens) presents the theory that Petra (Steve Garrett) killed his brother and is planning to have Princess Diana (Diana Hyland) killed.  After this theory is revealed to Princess Diana, she is chosen for the ceremony, and the high priest is killed.  After challenging Petra, Hercules is captured and held in a metal hole, down which soldiers pour oil to keep Hercules from climbing out.  Ortag rescues Hercules and dies fighting the monster which Hercules finally slays.  Princess Diana becomes ruler of Troy, and Hercules continues on his way.

Cast
Gordon Scott as Hercules
Paul Stevens as Diogenes
Mart Hulswit as Ulysses
Diana Hyland as Princess Diana
Steve Garrett as Petra
Gordon Mitchell as Pirate Captain
George Ardisson as Leander (as Giorgio Ardisson)
Roger Browne as Ortag
Jacques Stany as Argus (as Jacques Stanislawski)
Mario Novelli as Botus
Dan Christian as Boatswain
Everett Sloane as Narrator (voice)

See also
 List of American films of 1965

Biography

References

External links
 

1965 films
1960s fantasy adventure films
English-language Italian films
Peplum films
Fictional princesses
Fictional pirates
Films about Heracles
Films set in ancient Greece
Fictional priests and priestesses
Italian fantasy adventure films
Films directed by Albert Band
Sword and sandal films
1960s Italian films